Olmedo Canton is a canton of Ecuador, located in the Loja Province.  Its capital is the town of Olmedo.  Its population at the 2001 census was 5,707.

References

Cantons of Loja Province